is an 858 C.E. book by Japanese scholar and monk Ennin. In part of the book he describes Sanskrit sounds.

References

Late Old Japanese texts
9th-century Japanese books